Taşkan is a surname. Notable people with the surname include:

İdris Nebi Taşkan (born 1997), Turkish actor and basketball player
Şebnem Taşkan (born 1994), Turkish-German footballer

See also
Taskan

Turkish-language surnames